The Dublin Senior B Hurling Championship is an annual Gaelic Athletic Association competition involving the second tier hurling clubs in Dublin. The winners of the Dublin B Hurling Championship go on to qualify for the Dublin Senior Hurling Championship. The current senior B hurling club champions are Naomh Fionbarra.

Roll of Honour

References

External links 
Official Dublin Website
Dublin on Hoganstand
Dublin Club GAA
Reservoir Dubs

 5